Beata Beach (May 26, 1911 – November 23, 2006) was an American painter. Her work was part of the painting event in the art competition at the 1932 Summer Olympics.

References

External links
 

1911 births
2006 deaths
20th-century American painters
American women painters
Olympic competitors in art competitions
Italian emigrants to the United States
20th-century American women artists
21st-century American women